The 2013–14 LIU Brooklyn Blackbirds men's basketball team represented The Brooklyn Campus of Long Island University during the 2013–14 NCAA Division I men's basketball season. The Blackbirds, led by second year head coach Jack Perri, played their home games at the Athletic, Recreation & Wellness Center, with three home games at the Barclays Center, and were members of the Northeast Conference. They finished the season 9–20, 4–12 in NEC play to finish in ninth place and failed to qualify for the Northeast Conference Tournament.

Roster

Schedule

|-
!colspan=9 style="background:#000000; color:#FFFFFF;"|  Regular Season

References

LIU Brooklyn Blackbirds men's basketball seasons
Long Island
Long
Long